Jockey International, Inc. is an American manufacturer and retailer of underwear, sleepwear, and sportswear for men, women, and children. The company is based in Kenosha, Wisconsin. Jockey invented the first men's Y-Front brief in 1934 and is a recognized trademark in 120 countries.

History
Jockey was originally named Coopers Inc., and was found by Samuel T. Cooper in St. Joseph, Michigan in 1876 as a hosiery business. Cooper began the business after hearing that lumberjacks suffered from poorly constructed wool socks. In 1900, Cooper began making undergarments. By 1902 the business was expanding. However, by 1934 Coopers Inc. was nearly bankrupt due to the Great Depression. The company recruited Harry H. Wolf Sr., to restructure the company.

On January 19, 1935, during a blizzard, Coopers Inc. sold the world's first briefs at the Marshall Field's State Street store in downtown Chicago. Designed by so-called 'apparel engineer' Arthur Kneibler, briefs dispensed with leg sections and had a Y-shaped overlapping fly. The company dubbed it the Jockey, claiming it offered support like a jockstrap. Over 30,000 pairs were sold within three months of their introduction. Coopers used a Mascul-liner plane to deliver masculine support briefs to retailers across the US. When they were introduced to the UK in 1938, they sold 3,000 a week. 

In 1958, the company introduced the first mass-sale men's bikini brief, known as 'Skants'. The low-cut nylon and elastic brief, inspired by women's bikinis, had no front fly and was unlined apart from a small support panel at the lower front. Skants sold well in the 1960's and into the 1970's especially in the US and the UK. Initially  manufactured in white, blue and black, Skants were eventually produced in a wider variety of colours. They were popular with gay men at a time in which homosexuality was widely illegal. Skants were modified in the early 1970's to reduce the slightly raised join in the elastic on the hips (the new design was called 'Skants St Tropez'), but this brief was never popular because it lacked the support of the earlier design, and eventually succumbed to competition. Jockey still produces Skants, mostly cotton, for sale in several countries including South Africa and New Zealand. 

Coopers renamed itself Jockey Menswear, Inc. in 1971, and Jockey International, Inc. the following year. In 1997 Jockey acquired the seamless panties division of Formfit-Rogers, and sold them under the name Form-Fit (this branding was later discontinued). In 1982, Jockey introduced the Jockey For Her line of intimate apparel and underwear.

In August 2020, country singer Luke Bryan became a Jockey brand ambassador.

In October 2020, Jockey International's Indian and its affiliate Page Industries were investigated by the US-based Worldwide Responsible Accredited Production (WRAP) over allegations of human rights violations in one of its factories.

In December of 2020, Page Industries Ltd., the licensee of Jockey International in India, was recertified by Worldwide Responsible Accredited Production (WRAP) and found to be socially compliant. WRAP said human rights violations allegations were not substantiated by the findings of the audit.

Divisions
In 2000, Jockey began selling products online.

Jockey manufactured Life and Formfit brands temporarily for Wal-Mart and Target.  Jockey continues to manufacture the Life brand of men's underwear but discontinued the women's line in 2002. Jockey continues to manufacture both men's and women's lines for Target under the JKY brand.

In 2005, Jockey introduced its direct-selling division jockeyp2p.com.  The independent sales force, known as Comfort Specialist Consultants, sells products for women.  Product lines include outerwear, sportswear, active wear, and accessories. Jockey International Chairman and CEO Debra S. Waller founded Jockey Person to Person.

In India, Page Industries Ltd. is the licensee for Jockey.

Philanthropy
Jockey sponsors the Jockey Being Family Foundation, a charity focused on supporting families after they have adopted a child. This increases awareness of and accessibility to post-adoption services in the United States for adoptive families.

Models
Jockey's models have included:

 Chris Brooks
 Chanel Celaya Watkins
 Tom Clune
 Eli Cruz
 Nathalie Darcas
 Chris Dattola
 Anthony David
 Mallory Edens
 David Entinghe
 David Filipiak
 Davey Fisher
 Rachelle Goulding
 Don Hood
 Brett Kalli
 Jeff Kasser
 Anastasia Lupu
 Fernanda Marques
 Megan Martin Coolbaugh
 Maria Montgomery
 Connor Moxam
 Sean Myrie
 Ashley Novak
 Norbi Novak
 Gigi Paris
 Victoria Raemy
 Brooke Register
 Ashley Revollo
 Sherelle Sebastian
 Alden Steimle
 Jasmyn Wilkins
 Malia Williams
 Clara Wilsey
 Aurélie Wulff

See also

List of sock manufacturers

References

External links

Jockey
Jockey International, Inc. information at Hoover's Online
Jockey by Coopers heritage collection website

Clothing companies of the United States
Companies based in Wisconsin
Lingerie brands
Underwear brands
Hosiery brands
Kenosha, Wisconsin
Clothing companies established in 1876
1876 establishments in Michigan
Socks